Compania Română de Aviație Romavia R.A., usually referred to as Romavia , was a state airline from Romania, owned and controlled by the Romanian Ministry of National Defense. It operated VIP and charter flights, serving the demands of the Romanian state and its politicians. Romavia had its headquarters in Bucharest, with the base for its flight operations being located at the city's airports Henri Coandă and Băneasa.

History 
Romavia was formed by the Romanian government in 1990 and launched flight operations the following year.

Romavia set up an Aircraft Maintenance Organization, for the benefit of their own fleet and for other customers. The fleet consisted, among other models, of two Romanian-built BAC (Rombac) 1-11 (YR-BRE and the last worldwide build, YR-BRI with stage III Rolls-Royce engines).

As of August 2014, the company is bankrupt.

Fleet 

Over the years, Romavia operated the following aircraft types:

Incidents and accidents
On 10 January 1991, a Boeing 707-300 (registered YR-ABD) was damaged beyond repair during a crash landing at Bucharest Otopeni Airport. The aircraft had been on a crew training flight for soon-to-be-launched Romavia, when it hit the runway with its left wing, resulting in a fire. There were no casualties amongst the 13 persons on board.
On 13 December 1995, Banat Air Flight 166, an Antonov An-24 (registered YR-AMR) chartered from Romavia, crashed shortly after take-off from Verona Airport, killing all 41 passengers and 8 crew members on board. The accident most probably happened because of the aircraft having been overloaded and improperly de-iced.

References

External links

 Official website

Defunct airlines of Romania
Airlines established in 1990
Airlines disestablished in 2014
2010 disestablishments in Romania
Romanian companies established in 1990